Lembeja paradoxa, also known as the bagpipe cicada, is an insect in the family Cicadidae. It is found in parts of the Cape York Peninsula.

References

Cicadidae
Insects described in 1890